Nukusa cinerella is a moth of the family Autostichidae. It is found in Albania, Croatia, North Macedonia and Greece.

References

Moths described in 1941
Nukusa
Moths of Europe